H Street or "H" Street  is the eighth of a sequence of alphabetical streets in many cities.

It may refer to:
H Street (Washington, D.C.)
H Street/Benning Road Line, streetcar line in Washington, D.C.
H Street Festival, yearly festival in Washington, D.C.
H Street Playhouse, theatre and gallery in Washington, D.C.
H Street station, trolley car station in San Diego, California
H-Street, skateboarding company associated with Tony Magnusson